Opalchenska Metro Station is a station on the Sofia Metro in Bulgaria. It opened on 17 September 1999.

Location
The metro station lies under Todor Alexandrov Boulevard between Opalchenska Street and Hristo Botev Boulevard. The west vestibule has 4 entries on the intersection of Todor Alexandrov Boulevard and Opalchenska Street and the east vestibule has 2 entries on the intersection of Todor Alexandrov Boulevard and Strandzha Street.

Architecture
The platform and the concourses have a modern design. The platform is a non-column type. The floors are lined with ceramic panels in brown-beige and green color corresponding to the outlook of the ceiling. The ceiling at the platform is made of vertical aluminum frames, forming figures with color stripes at the edges, placed above the lamps along the axis of the station. Groups of stainless steel benches are placed around the lamps. Sloping metal panels framed with blue and green stripes are put on the walls of the platform. The main lighting fixture is installed into inclined milk-white panels, placed at both ends of the platform. In the concourses it is installed into the suspended ceilings. The concourses are lined with granite and aluminum plates, while the underpasses are implemented with mineral masonry, forming geometric shapes. The suspended ceilings are white, made of 30 cm components of Hunter Douglas type, longitudinally arranged with colored stripes. The entrances are lined with beige marble and poly-carbonate arch-shaped coverings.

The architectural layout is created by architects I. Stanishev and Kr. Andreev. A draft, created by the same authors and put up to competitive procedure is serving as a base of the final design.

Automatic Platform Screen Door (APSD)
In September 2020, Automatic Platform screen doors started to operate at Opalchenska Metro station after a month such barriers were launched at the Vasil Levski Stadium Metro Station of the Sofia Metro. By 2022, this RSD (Rope-type Screen Door) system will be implemented at the busiest 12 stations of the Line 1 and Line 2 of the Sofia Metro.

APSD Gallery

Interchange with other public transport
 Tramway service: 3, 8, 10, 20, 22
 Trolleybus service: 1, 3, 5,7
 Bus service: 60, 74

References

External links

 360 degrees panorama from inside the station
 Sofia Metropolitan (Official site)
 Unofficial site
 360 degree panorama from outside the station (west end)

Sofia Metro stations
Railway stations opened in 1999
1999 establishments in Bulgaria